Talley Road Halt railway station served the town of Llandeilo, in the historical county of Glamorganshire, Wales, from 1859 to 1955 on the Vale of Towy Railway.

History 
The station was opened as Talley Road in September 1859 by the Vale of Towy Railway. Its name was changed to Talley Road Halt in 1941 but this change only occurred in the handbook of stations in 1944. The station closed on 4 April 1955 but it was still open as Talley Road Siding in the 1960s.

References 

 

Disused railway stations in Carmarthenshire
Railway stations in Great Britain opened in 1859
Railway stations in Great Britain closed in 1955
1859 establishments in Wales
1955 disestablishments in Wales